Florida Prepaid Postsecondary Education Expense Board v. College Savings Bank, 527 U.S. 627 (1999), was a decision by the Supreme Court of the United States relating to the doctrine of sovereign immunity.

Florida Prepaid was a companion case to the similarly named (but not to be confused) College Savings Bank v. Florida Prepaid Postsecondary Education Expense Board, 527 U.S. 666 (1999). Where College Savings Bank was an action brought under the Lanham Act, Florida Prepaid was a concurrent action brought under the Patent and Plant Variety Protection Remedy Clarification Act. Although it was unnecessary to reach the question of whether Congress had validly abrogated Florida's sovereign immunity in College Savings Bank, the question was unavoidable in Florida Prepaid.

Findings

In a 5–4 decision authored by Chief Justice William Rehnquist, the court held that the Act's abrogation of States' sovereign immunity was invalid. Congress could only abrogate sovereign immunity pursuant to its powers under § 5 of the Fourteenth Amendment and not Article I (see Fitzpatrick v. Bitzer; Seminole Tribe of Florida v. Florida).  Applying the § 5 test provided in City of Boerne v. Flores, the validity of the Act could not be sustained.

Implications
The results of the case are cited repeatedly in subsequent patent cases, and criticized.

Justice Stephen Breyer, in Active Liberty (Federalism), mentions the case as example of potentially overreaching or counterproductive restriction of federal authority to "create uniform individual remedies under legislation dealing with nationwide problems—for example, private civil damages actions for citizens injured by a state's unlawful use of their intellectual property."

See also
 List of United States Supreme Court cases, volume 527
 List of United States Supreme Court cases
 Lists of United States Supreme Court cases by volume

References

External links
 

United States Supreme Court cases
United States Supreme Court cases of the Rehnquist Court
United States Eleventh Amendment case law
Legal history of Florida
1999 in United States case law
United States Constitution Article One case law